Tannaz Tabatabaei (born May 10, 1983) is an Iranian actress. She has received various accolades, including two Crystal Simorgh for her performances in Drown (2020) and Without Her (2022) and two Iran's Film Critics and Writers Association Awards for The Voices (2009) and Villa Dwellers (2017).

Early life 
She has been active since 2000 with acting in Cinema, TV-Series and Theatre and started her occupation by passing Hiva-Film acting free classes and she has chosen for Zabih after a month but her first role as an actress in cinema was I Saw Your Dad Last Night, Aida by Rasul Sadr Ameli.

Tannaz shows her abilities by acting on Mive Mamnoue which she was one of main roles and she completed it in the best way for her role in  Marham. 

In 2009, she won award for best supporting actress for her role as Negar in Sadaha.

In 2010, she presented for acting in two banned screening movie, Gozaresh yek jashn directed by Ebrahim Hatamikia and Parinaz directed by Bahram Bahramian. 

In 2017, she won award for best supporting actress for her role as Sima in Vilaeiha at the 11nd critics' choice movie award for best iranian film. 

She has also worked in music and painting except cinema.

Filmography

Film

Television

Web

Theatre

References

External links
 Tannaz Tabatabaei at IMDb
Tannaz Tabatabaei on SourehCinema (in Persian)

1983 births
Living people
People from Tehran
Actresses from Tehran
Iranian film actresses
Iranian stage actresses
Iranian television actresses
Crystal Simorgh for Best Actress winners
Crystal Simorgh for Best Supporting Actress winners
Islamic Azad University, Central Tehran Branch alumni